Barry Connolly (30 August 1938 – 6 May 2011) was an Australian rules footballer who played with Footscray in the Victorian Football League (VFL).

Recruited from Benalla, where he initially played in the Benalla Junior Football League with the Rockets, who won the 1953 BJFL premiership. Connolly won the BJFL goal kicking with 48 goals in 1953, then played with Benalla in 1954, coming second in the 1954 Reserves best and fairest award to John Connolly. Connolly polled seven votes in the 1954 O&MFL Reserves best and fairest award, the Marks Medal to finish equal third. Connolly then played in Benalla's 1955 O&MFL Reserves premiership team, as a 17 year old, prior to being a regular Ovens & Murray Football League senior player in 1956 and 1957.

A centreman, Connolly spent the 1958 VFL season at Footscray and kicked three goals against Richmond on his debut. At the end of the year he returned to the country and went on to have a long career as a player, coach and administrator.

In 1965, he was seriously injured while working at a tin mine when a barrel of sulphuric acid exploded. He was burnt extensively and spent six weeks recovering in hospital. He was coach of the Ardlethan Football Club during this time.

Connolly coached Goulburn Valley Football League club Shepparton United in 1983 and 1984, then served as the league's president from 1985 to 2002.

Family
He and his wife Monica had four children, including former Fremantle coach Chris Connolly.

References

1938 births
2011 deaths
Western Bulldogs players
Benalla Football Club players
Australian rules football administrators
Australian rules footballers from Victoria (Australia)
Place of birth missing
Place of death missing